Van Alstyne is a city in Grayson and Collin Counties in the U.S. state of Texas. The population was 3,046 at the 2010 census, up from 2,502 at the 2000 census. The Grayson County portion of Van Alstyne is part of the Sherman–Denison Metropolitan Statistical Area.

History
Van Alstyne was built in 1873, for settlers to be near the railroad stop of the Houston and Texas Central Railway. The town was named for either William A. Van Alstyne, a civil engineer with the railroad, or for Marie Van Alstyne, a shareholder in the railroad company.

The town was incorporated in 1890.

Per a Van Alstyne Leader newspaper article September 3, 2015 the Outlaw "Bushwhacker Bill" Wilson, on whom the Clint Eastwood movie The Outlaw Josey Wales is based, was murdered somewhere in the vicinity of either the intersection of Texas Hwy 5 and Prong Creek 1 mile North of Van Alstyne or South of Van Alstyne halfway to the old ghost town  of Mantua.

Geography

Van Alstyne is located in southeastern Grayson County at  (33.423911, –96.578730). The city limits extend south slightly into Collin County.

The U.S. Route 75 freeway runs through the western side of the city, with access from Exits 50 and 51. US 75 leads north  to Denison and south  to the center of Dallas. Van Alstyne's immediate neighbors are Anna to the south and Howe to the north.

Demographics

2020 census

As of the 2020 United States census, there were 4,369 people, 1,307 households, and 1,108 families residing in the city.

2010 census
As of the census of 2010,  3,046 people, 1114 households, and 832 families resided in the city. The racial makeup of the city was 88.7% White, 4.50% African American, 0.8% Native American, 0.7% Asian, 3.7% from other races, and 2.1% from two or more races. Hispanics or Latinos of any race were 9.4% of the population.

Of the 1114 households, 37.9% had children under the age of 18 living with them, 57% were married couples living together, 12.8% had a female householder with no husband present, 4.8% had a male householder with no wife present, and 25.3% were not families. About 22.4% of all households were made up of householders living alone,  2.0% had a male living alone who was 65 years of age or older, and 8.9% had a female living alone who was 65 years of age or older . The average household size was 2.69 and the average family size was 3.5.

In the city, the population was distributed as 30.5% under the age of 19, 4.9% from 19 to 24, 24.5% from 25 to 44, 25% from 45 to 64, and 14.0% who were 65 years of age or older. The median age was 38.2 years. For every 100 females, there were 96.2 males.

The median income for a household in the city was $51,450, and for a family was $69,773. About 9.5% of families and 10.4% of the population were below the poverty line, including 9.6% of those under age 18 and 13.0% of those age 65 or over.

Education

Public schools
Students are served by the Van Alstyne Independent School District. Schools in the district include Partin Elementary School (formerly Van Alstyne Elementary School), Sanford Elementary School, Van Alstyne Middle School and Van Alstyne High School.

Colleges
Grayson County College operates a branch campus in Van Alstyne.

References

External links
 
 Van Alstyne Chamber of Commerce
 Van Alstyne Community Development Corporation
 City of Van Alstyne Demographics

Cities in Grayson County, Texas
Cities in Texas
Dallas–Fort Worth metroplex
1890 establishments in Texas
Populated places established in 1890